Hanwal  is a village in the southern state of Karnataka, India. It is located in the Koppal taluk of Koppal district in Karnataka.

Demographics
As of 2001, the Indian census showed that Hanwal had a population of 5864 with 2903 males and 2961 females.

See also
 Koppal
 Districts of Karnataka

References

External links
 http://Koppal.nic.in/

Villages in Koppal district